The "State Anthem of the Republic of Mari El" is the regional anthem of Mari El, a federal subject of Russia. The anthem has lyrics in three languages: the two versions of Mari, and Russian.

History 
The anthem was approved by the Supreme Council of the Mari SSR on 9 July 1992. The anthem was written by professional composer and member of the Union of Russian Composers Yuri Evdokimov to the words of poet and member of the Union of Writers of Russia . An original second verse was excluded from the official lyrics.

The description and procedure for using the anthem of the Republic of Mari El is not regulated by law. The Regulations on the Anthem are in force, approved by the Decree of the Supreme Council of the Mari SSR dated 07/09/1992 No. 313-III, and the text of the anthem is contained in the appendix to this Decree.

In the years that followed, there were several attempts to change the anthem.

In January 2000, the Government of the Republic of Mari El announced a competition for the creation of a new anthem. At the first stage, it was proposed to consider recognised works of Mari composers, as well as works by contemporary composers written specifically for the competition. At the second stage, it was proposed to choose the text of the anthem. The resolution stated that the competition was held in connection with the appeal of the public of the republic about the need to change the existing anthem.

In February 2007, a second competition was announced. Unlike the previous competition, in the first round it was allowed to present music with text in one of the state languages ​​of the Republic of Mari El (creative collaboration between composer and poet was encouraged). It was reported that eight applications from various authors were submitted for the first stage of the competition. However, due to a lack of worthy contestants, the competition was declared invalid, and the Government announced a new competition with extended deadlines for the stages. It was reported that this time 11 applications were submitted. The results were supposed to be announced on 25 January 2008, but this did not happen.

Protocol 
According to the Regulations on the National Anthem of the Republic of Mari El, the anthem can be performed in any vocal or instrumental version, in strict accordance with the approved text and musical version.

The anthem of the Republic of Mari El is performed at official ceremonies, at the raising of the flag of the Republic of Mari El, at the opening and closing of sessions of the State Assembly of the Republic of Mari El and at meetings and departures of heads of state and heads of governments of foreign countries visiting the Republic of Mari El on official visits.

The anthem can also be performed at solemn events held by state authorities and local self-government bodies of the Republic of Mari El, as well as other organisations, at the opening and closing of sessions of representative authorities of the municipalities of the republic, at the opening of monuments and the presentation of awards established by the authorities of the Republic of Mari El.

During public performance of the State Anthem of the Republic of Mari El, those present listen to the Anthem while standing, and men take off their headdresses or put their hand to it.

In television broadcasts of the Mari El State TV and Radio Broadcasting Campaign, the anthem is performed on the days of national holidays; in radio broadcasts – daily at the beginning of the programme.

The anthem can be performed in an orchestral, choral, orchestral-choral or other vocal and instrumental performance.

Lyrics

References

Mari El Republic
Regional songs
Mari music
National anthem compositions in E major
National anthem compositions in F major